Petra Maarit Olli (born June 5, 1994) is a retired Finnish freestyle wrestler. She won the silver medal at the 2015 World Wrestling Championships in the Women's freestyle 58 kg-event. In March 2016 Olli won her first European Championship gold medal at the Senior-level in Riga, Latvia, defeating Oksana Herhel of Ukraine.

She was the first Finnish woman to win a World gold, defeating Danielle Lappage of Canada in the finals of the 2018 World Wrestling Championships in Budapest, Hungary.

Olli missed the 2019 World Wrestling Championships due to health problems. She retired from wrestling in 2020.

References

External links
 

Living people
1994 births
Finnish female sport wrestlers
Wrestlers at the 2010 Summer Youth Olympics
Wrestlers at the 2015 European Games
European Games competitors for Finland
Wrestlers at the 2016 Summer Olympics
Olympic wrestlers of Finland

World Wrestling Championships medalists
European Wrestling Championships medalists
World Wrestling Champions
People from Lappajärvi
Sportspeople from South Ostrobothnia
21st-century Finnish women